Julia Elizabeth Bergner is a mathematician specializing in algebraic topology, homotopy theory, and higher category theory. She is a professor of mathematics at the University of Virginia.

Education and career
Bergner graduated from Gonzaga University in 2000. She completed her Ph.D. at the University of Notre Dame in 2005. Her dissertation, Three Models for the Homotopy Theory of Homotopy Theories, was supervised by William Gerard Dwyer.

After postdoctoral research at Kansas State University, she joined the mathematics faculty at the University of California, Riverside in 2008. She moved from there to the University of Virginia in 2016.

Selected publications
Bergner is the author of the book The homotopy theory of (1)-categories (London Mathematical Society Student Texts 90, Cambridge University Press, 2018).

Her other publications include:

Recognition
In 2018, the Association for Women in Mathematics gave Bergner the Ruth I. Michler Memorial Prize for her research on algebraic -theory.

References

External links
Home page

Year of birth missing (living people)
Living people
21st-century American mathematicians
American women mathematicians
Gonzaga University alumni
University of Notre Dame alumni
University of California, Riverside faculty
University of Virginia faculty
21st-century women mathematicians
21st-century American women